Marvel is the third full-length release from the New Zealand Christian rock band The Lads. Following its release in 2001 it won "Gospel Album of the Year" at the 2002 New Zealand Music Awards.

Track listing 
 "Wonderful Day" - 3:26
 "Creator" - 4:05
 "Who is Mikey Trousers?" - 3:08
 "You're a Star" - 4:13
 "Call My Name" - 3:54
 "Warm" - 4:54
 "Freedom" - 3:21
 "Cannibalism" - 3:36 
 "International Mystery Man" - 3:29
 "Supersonic" - 3:22
 "Open" - 4:23
 "Island" - 4:42

Singles

Trivia
The song "Who Is Mikey Trousers?" was featured on the 'Best of the Pacific' playlist, an in-flight radio show played on all Canadian Airlines and Air Canada flights. They are the only New Zealand band to achieve this feat.

Personnel
Mark Millard – Vocals, Saxophone
Matt Chapman – Guitar, Backing Vocals
Bennett Knowles – Bass, Backing Vocals
Chris White – Guitar, Synthesizer, Piano, Trumpet, Accordion, Backing Vocals
Steve King - Drums, Backing Vocals

References

2001 albums
The Lads albums